Jacob Rajan  is a Malaysian-born-New Zealand playwright and actor. His highly successful plays include the trilogy Krishnan's Dairy, The Candlestick Maker and The Pickle King. Another work was The Dentist's Chair. In 2002, he received the prestigious Laureate Art Award. All of Rajan's plays, except his first, Krishnan's Dairy, were originally produced for his theatre company, Indian Ink Theatre Company, and co-written with director/writer Justin Lewis, co-founder of Indian Ink.

Rajan was born in Malaysia to Indian parents, and migrated to New Zealand when he was four years old. After studying science at the University of Otago, he went to teacher's college, then studied acting and at Toi Whakaari New Zealand Drama School. He graduated in 1994 and has since appeared in different stage and screen productions as well as touring internationally. He appeared as Dr Ashwin Bhashar in the television soap Shortland Street.

With Justin Lewis, Rajan co-founded the Indian Ink Theatre Company in 1996. His most significant works are with this company and include the trilogy of plays which explore Indian themes, characters and stories. Krishnan's Dairy, The Candlestick Maker and The Guru Of Chai have been extremely popular plays in NZ. In 1999, Krishnan's Dairy won the Edinburgh Festival Fringe First award. The Pickle King won the same award in 2003. Other work includes Kiss the Fish.

Rajan says he "writes the stories that move him – they might happen to have Indian elements just because that's his frame of reference, but he doesn't set out to write Indian plays."

Plays 
 Krishnan's Dairy
 The Candlestick Maker
 The Pickle King
 The Dentist's Chair
 Guru of Chai
 Kiss the Fish
Paradise, or the Impermanence of Icecream

References

External links
 Rajan's theatre company, Indian Ink
 

21st-century New Zealand dramatists and playwrights
New Zealand male stage actors
New Zealand people of Indian descent
Toi Whakaari alumni
University of Otago alumni
Living people
Members of the New Zealand Order of Merit
Year of birth missing (living people)
New Zealand male soap opera actors
20th-century New Zealand male actors
21st-century New Zealand male actors
New Zealand male dramatists and playwrights